{{DISPLAYTITLE:Plasmin-α2-antiplasmin complex}}
Plasmin-α2-antiplasmin complex (PAP) is a 1:1 irreversibly formed inactive complex of the enzyme plasmin and its inhibitor α2-antiplasmin. It is a marker of the activity of the fibrinolytic system and a marker of net activation of fibrinolysis.

PAP levels are increased with pregnancy and by ethinylestradiol-containing combined birth control pills. Conversely, levels of PAP do not appear to be affected with menopausal hormone therapy. PAP levels have been reported to be elevated in men with prostate cancer.

References

Coagulation system
Protein complexes